Newsholme is a hamlet in the East Riding of Yorkshire, England.

It forms part of the civil parish of Wressle.

In 1823 Newsholme with Brind was in the parish of Wressle, the Wapentake of Harthill and the Liberty of Howdenshire. Population at the time was 177.

References

External links

Villages in the East Riding of Yorkshire